CA6 may refer to :
 Carbonic anhydrase VI, a human gene
 United States Court of Appeals for the Sixth Circuit

CA-6 may refer to
USS California (ACR-6), a ship
California's 6th congressional district
California State Route 6 (1934)
CAC Wackett, an aircraft